Fungal immunomodulatory proteins (FIPs) are a type of functional compound (other compounds include polysaccharides and triterpenoids) found in various species of fungi. FIPs are part of the immunoglobulin (ig) family, which are structurally similar to human antibodies, and can interact with human peripheral blood mononuclear cells (PBMCs), causing these cells to secrete different types of hormones and regulate cellular activity.

History 

The first FIP was discovered in 1989 by Japanese scientist Kohsuke Kino et al. from the water extract of the mycelium of Ganoderma lucidum, and was named Ling Zhi-8 (LZ-8).

From then on, researchers have identified numerous structurally similar proteins from various types of fungi that also share a high degree of genetic similarity as well as physiological activities, and thus coined the term fungal immunomodulatory protein (FIP).

Members of the FIP family 
Currently known FIPs are listed below:

 LZ-8 from G. lucidum
 LZ-9 from G. lucidum
 FIP-gts from G. tsugae
 FIP-gsi (NCBI DNA Accession number AY987805; Protein Accession number AAX98241) from G. sinensis
 GMI (FIP-gmi) (NCBI GI Accession number 310942694; Protein Data Bank Accession number 3KCW_A) from G. microsporum
 FIP-tve (NCBI DNA Accession number XM_008037967; Protein Accession number XP_008036158) from Trametes versicolor
 FIP-pcp from Poria cocos
 FIP-fve (NCBI DNA Accession number GU388420; Protein Accession number ADB24832) from Flammulina velutipes
 FIP-vvo from Volvariella volvacea
 FIP-aca from Antrodia camphorate
 FIP-lrh from Lignosus rhinocerotis

References 

Immunoglobulin superfamily
Fungal proteins